Stedman Prescott (August 30, 1896 – November 14, 1968) was an American jurist who served as Chief Judge of the Maryland Court of Appeals.

Biography
Prescott was born in Norbeck, Montgomery County, Maryland to Alexander F. Prescott and Edith Stanley Kellogg Prescott. He was initially educated at Rockville Academy, and graduated from Rockville High School in 1914. He attended Georgetown University, where he received his LL.B. degree in 1919. He also served in the United States Army from 1917 to 1918, during World War I.

In 1924, Prescott was admitted to the Maryland Bar and engaged in private practice as a defense attorney in Rockville. He served as a member of the Rockville City Council from 1924 to 1930, as state's attorney for Montgomery County from 1930 to 1934, and as a member of the Maryland Senate from 1935 to 1938.

Prescott was confirmed as an associate judge of the 6th District of the Montgomery County Circuit in 1938, and was later confirmed as Chief Judge of the circuit in 1955. He served in that position until 1958, when he was chosen to serve on the Maryland Court of Appeals as an associate judge. He was appointed Chief Judge in 1964, and served until August 30, 1966.

Prescott married Edith Callender Minnick on July 14, 1917, with whom he had four children: Calla P. Belt, Stedman Prescott, Jr., Mary P. Rosenberger, and Anne P. Brandau.

References
Biography from the Maryland Archives

1896 births
1968 deaths
20th-century American judges
United States Army personnel of World War I
Chief Judges of the Maryland Court of Appeals
Georgetown University Law Center alumni
Maryland lawyers
Maryland state senators
People from Montgomery County, Maryland
United States Army soldiers
20th-century American politicians
20th-century American lawyers